Herald (formerly The True Latter Day Saints' Herald and  The Saints' Herald) is the official periodical of Community of Christ. It is published monthly in English in Independence, Missouri, by Herald House Publishing.

The True Latter Day Saints' Herald was first published in January 1860, at Cincinnati, Ohio, as the official newspaper of the newly organized Reorganized Church of Jesus Christ of Latter Day Saints (RLDS Church). Its editor was Isaac Sheen. In March 1863, publication moved to Plano, Illinois, and in November 1881 to Lamoni, Iowa. In May 1921 the publication moved to its current location in Independence, Missouri.

The Herald has had several name changes in its history:

The True Latter Day Saints' Herald (1860–76)
The Saints' Herald (1877–1953)
Saints' Herald (1954–72)
Saints Herald (1973–2000)
Herald (2001–present)

See also
List of Latter Day Saint periodicals
Ensign (LDS magazine)

Notes

References
Inez Smith Davis (1981). The Story of the Church (Independence, Missouri: Herald House)

External links
The Saints' Herald: text of selected articles, 1860–1992
Links to issues of The Saints' Herald


Publications established in 1860
Community of Christ
English-language magazines
Latter Day Saint periodicals
1860 in Christianity
1860 in Ohio
Newspapers published in Missouri